Nasiba Abdullaeva is Soviet and Uzbek pop singer, People's artist of Uzbekistan (1993), People's artist of Azerbaijani (2022). She has performed songs in Uzbek, Persian, Azerbaijani, Arabic, Tajik, Russian and other languages.

Biography 
Nasiba Abdullaeva was born on November 15, 1961, in Samarkand in a family of workers, father Melik Yarmukhamedov and mother Khalchuchuk Halimakulova, was the youngest seventh child. As a child, she studied at a music school, accordion class. After an unsuccessful attempt to enter the Institute of Architecture and Civil Engineering, she worked as a music teacher at school. 

In 1980, Nasiba was invited as a soloist to the newly organized vocal-instrumental ensemble "Samarkand". In the same year, two albums were released with songs performed by her – "Bari Gal" and "Samarkand". Upon graduation in 1989 from the Uzbekistan State Institute of Arts and Cultureshe began to work at the Uzbek State Philharmonic. 

In 1990 she released her first solo album "Ayriliq (Separation)". After a divorce from her husband in 2000, she left the stage for two years.

In 2002 she returned to the stage. Since 2004 she has been teaching a course at the State Conservatory at the Department of Variety Performing Arts.

Awards 
 Honored Artist of the Uzbek SSR (1987)
 People's Artist of Uzbekistan (1993)
 Order "Mehnat Shuhrati" (1999)
 Order "Fidokorona xizmatlari uchun" (2018)

Discography 
 1980 — "Bari gal"
 1980 — "Samarkand"
 1990 — "Ayriliq"
 2000 — "Sog'inch"
 2002 — "Umr bahori"
 2006 — "Eslanar"
 2014 — "Baxt oʻzi nimadur?"

References 

1961 births
People from Samarkand
People's Artists of Uzbekistan
21st-century Uzbekistani women singers
Living people